Algeria and Israel have no official diplomatic relations, with Algeria being part of the Arab League boycott of Israel, and officially does not recognise the State of Israel. Algeria refuses entry to any person holding an Israeli passport or any other passport which has a visa from Israel. In 2016, an Algerian high school geography textbook that contained a map that included Israel was withdrawn. In January 2017, an Algerian was arrested after an online video interview with an Israeli official.

History
Shortly after Algeria gained its independence in 1962, Israel recognized the country's independence.

During the Six-Day War in 1967, Algeria sent a battalion of infantry and a squadron of MiG-21s to Egypt, losing three Mig-21s to Israel.

During the Yom Kippur War in 1973, Algeria sent an expeditionary force to fight Israel, including 59 aircraft (Mig-21, Mig-17, Su-7), an infantry platoon and an armored brigade (with an estimated 19 artillery weapons).

In the mid-1990s, while Israel and other North African states slowly started diplomatic relations, Algeria remained one of the last countries to refrain from  such a move. It was only when Prime Minister of Israel Ehud Barak met President of Algeria Abdelaziz Bouteflika at the funeral of the Moroccan King Hassan II of Morocco on July 25, 1999, that alleged unofficial comments were made.

In January 2012, both Algeria and Israel as part of the Mediterranean Dialogue attended the 166th Military Committee meetings with NATO members in Brussels.

Modern days 

In 2020, amidst Gulf states' call to normalise relations, and the Hirak political renewal impact on the country's internal affairs, some voices were calling on reviewing the country's bilateral relations in a way that benefits the country, although Israel never figured in that list.

Moreover, that only insists on the fact that Algeria seems like a country that is far from any normalisation with Israel. Mainly due to Algeria's background of the anti-colonial struggle that is considered as part of the same struggle as the Palestinians in the 60s and 70s.

See also
History of the Jews in Algeria

References

External links
Report: Israel intensifies intelligence efforts in Algeria, Al Bawaba

 
Israel
Bilateral relations of Israel